Mario Tanassi (17 March 1916 – 5 May 2007) was an Italian politician, who was several times Minister of the Italian Republic. In 1979 he was condemned by the Constitutional Court of Italy for his involvement in the Lockheed bribery scandal.

Biography
Tanassi was born at Ururi, in the province of Campobasso. He joined the Italian Democratic Socialist Party (Partito Socialista Democratico Italiano; PSDI) and was later national co-secretary, alongside Francesco De Martino, of the unified PSI-PSDI, a short-lived reunion of the PSDI and the Italian Socialist Party.

He was minister of defence for the first time in the Rumor II Cabinet (1970), formed by an alliance between Christian Democracy (DC), PSI and PSDI. In 1972 he was again appointed as minister of defence, as well as vice-prime minister, in the Andreotti II Cabinet (in which the Italian Liberal Party had replaced the Socialists). Tanassi was minister of defence for the third time in the fourth Rumor Government (DC-PSI-PSDI-PRI).

After a short tenure in 1972, in June 1975 he again became national secretary of the PSDI, replacing Flavio Orlandi. Soon afterwards, he was involved in the Lockheed bribery scandal together with Mariano Rumor and Luigi Gui, causing him to lose his position as the party's secretary. In 1979 the Constitutional Court of Italy found him guilty of bribery and he spent four months in jail. He was the first Italian former minister to serve a prison sentence and the first politician convicted before the nationwide Clean Hands corruption scandals in the 1990s.

References

External links

1916 births
2007 deaths
People from the Province of Campobasso
Italian Democratic Socialist Party politicians
20th-century Italian politicians
Government ministers of Italy
Finance ministers of Italy
Italian Ministers of Defence
Deputy Prime Ministers of Italy